Robert Grudin (born 1938) is an American writer and philosopher.

Life
Grudin graduated from Harvard, and earned a Ph.D. in comparative literature from the University of California, Berkeley in 1969. He received a Guggenheim Fellowship for 1992–1993. Until 1998 he was a professor of English at the University of Oregon. He has written about many political and philosophical themes including liberty, determinism, creativity, and several others.

Career
Grudin is the author of the metafictional novel Book. He has also written Mighty Opposites: Shakespeare and Renaissance Contrariety, The Grace of Great Things: Creativity and Innovation (finalist for the 1991 Oregon Book Award), On Dialogue: An Essay in Free Thought, Time and the Art of Living, The Most Amazing Thing, and, most recently, American Vulgar: The Politics of Manipulation Versus the Culture of Awareness.

Bibliography

Fiction
Book: A Novel (1992)
The Most Amazing Thing (2001)

Non-fiction
Mighty Opposites: Shakespeare and Renaissance Contrariety (1979)
Time and the Art of Living (1982)
The Grace of Great Things: Creativity and Innovation (1990)
On Dialogue: An Essay in Free Thought (1996)
American Vulgar: The Politics of Manipulation Versus the Culture of Awareness (2006)
"Boccaccio's 'Decameron' and the Ciceronian Renaissance" co-authored with Michaela Paasche Grudin" (2012)
"Design and Truth" (2010)

See also
American philosophy
List of American philosophers

References

External links

 Robert Grudin's home page
 Robert Grudin, Professor Emeritus, University of Oregon

1938 births
20th-century American novelists
21st-century American novelists
American male novelists
American philosophers
Comparative literature academics
Harvard University alumni
Living people
University of California, Berkeley alumni
People from Red Bank, New Jersey
21st-century American non-fiction writers
American male non-fiction writers
20th-century American male writers
21st-century American male writers